The following are the football (soccer) events of the year 1908 throughout the world.

Events

Winners club national championship 
Argentina: Belgrano(*)
Belgium : Racing CB
England: Manchester United
FA Cup: Wolves
Finland: Unitas Helsinki
Germany: Viktoria Berlin (winners of a regional league play-off)(*)
Hungary: MTK(*)
Italy: Pro Vercelli(*)
Netherlands : Quick Den Haag(*)
Scotland: For fuller coverage, see 1907-08 in Scottish football.
Scottish Division One – Celtic
Scottish Division Two – Raith Rovers
Scottish Cup – Celtic
Sweden: IFK Gothenburg(*)
Switzerland: FC Winterthur (winners of a play-off)(*)
Uruguay: River Plate(*)
Greece: F.C. Goudi Athens

(*)Amateur league

International tournaments
Torneo Internazionale Stampa Sportiva, in Turin, Italy:
  Servette FC
  Torino
Olympic Games in London, United Kingdom (October 19 – 24 1908)
  Great Britain
 
 
1908 British Home Championship

Clubs founded
March 25 – Clube Atlético Mineiro (Brazil)
July 19 – Feyenoord (Netherlands)
September 26 – SK Brann (Norway)
Hartlepool United F.C. (England)
March 9 – F.C. Internazionale Milano (Italy)
R.S.C. Anderlecht (Belgium)
Huddersfield Town F.C. (England)
Panathinaikos FC (Greece)
U.S. Lecce (Italy)
St Albans City F.C. (England)
S.S.C. Bari (Italy)
Real Murcia (Spain)
FC Lugano (Switzerland)
 ŁKS Łódź (Poland)
LASK (Austria)

Births
 March 21 – Juan López Fontana, Uruguayan football manager (died 1983)
 April 20 – Pierre Korb, French international footballer (died 1980)
 June 4 – Alejandro Villanueva, Peruvian footballer (died 1944)
 June 8 – Leo Lemešić, Croatian football player and manager (died 1978)
 August 1 – William Ling, English football referee (died 1984)

Deaths

References 

 
Association football by year